Senilites tristanicola is a species of beetle in the family Dytiscidae, the only species in the genus Senilites.

References

Dytiscidae